is a professional Japanese baseball player. He plays outfielder for the Yokohama DeNA BayStars.

External links

 NPB.com

1995 births
Living people
Baseball people from Aichi Prefecture
Japanese baseball players
Nippon Professional Baseball outfielders
Yokohama DeNA BayStars players
Yaquis de Obregón players
Japanese expatriate baseball players in Mexico